The Musée d'Anatomie Delmas-Orfila-Rouvière was a museum of anatomy formerly located on the eighth floor of the Faculty of Medicine, Paris V René Descartes University, 45, rue des Saints-Pères, 6th arrondissement of Paris, France. It was the largest anatomy museum in France. It was closed around 2005, with all its exhibits going into storage. 

In 2011 the collections were donated to the University of Montpellier and are on display in the Medical School.

History
The museum dated from 1794 when Honoré Fragonard, demonstrator and professor of anatomy, collected specimens for the Faculty of Medicine of Paris's new anatomical cabinet. Although the city had contained earlier, amateur collections, including a set of more than 1000 wax anatomical models bequeathed by Jean-Baptiste Sue to the École des Beaux-Arts, these earlier collections were dispersed during the French Revolution.

The cabinet's anatomical collection was reorganized and vigorously expanded by Mathieu Orfila. Appointed dean of the Faculty of Medicine of Paris in 1832, Orfila visited the Hunterian Museum and was inspired by its collections of comparative anatomy. In 1844 he established a museum, which in 1847 was formally inaugurated and named the Musée Orfila in his honor. By 1881 it contained nearly 4500 items, as documented in the catalog published by its curator, Charles Nicolas Houel. Unfortunately, during the early 20th century, the museum fell into great disrepair. According to the museum's web site, precious wax models by Laumonier were consumed for lighting, and only a few hundred of Houel's cataloged items still remain. In 1947, however, Prof. André Delmas began an effort to restore and greatly enlarge the Musée Orfila, conjoining it with the Musée Rouvière, the lymphatic collection of Prof. Henri Rouvière (1876-1952). Since 1953 the museum occupied the vast exhibition halls and galleries of the eighth floor of the Faculty of Medicine.

The museum contained about 5,800 human and animal anatomical items. It contained a wide range of anatomical specimens, including a small monkey preserved by Fragonard in 1797; Paul Broca's castings brains of birds, mammals, and humans, including the brains of children, criminals, and representatives of various races, as well as his own brain; showcases of comparative anatomy of reptiles and birds; casts of the heads of criminals executed during the 19th century; a collection of skulls from asylums for the mentally ill; major exhibits of different stages of growth of the skeleton, splanchnology (casts of livers, hearts, lungs, and trachea), and of the viscera and major vessels of the human body; and displays of malformations of the brain caused in rats (Giroud-Delmas), lymph systems (Marie Philibert Constant Sappey), kidney structure (Augier), trachea (Eralp), esophagus (Sussini), and liver. It also included the Spitzner collection, a famous set of anatomical wax models dating from the 19th Century.

See also 
 List of museums in Paris
 Musée Dupuytren
 Musée Fragonard d'Alfort, Maisons-Alfort

References 

 Musée d'Anatomie Delmas-Orfila-Rouvière
 Paris.org entry (French)
 Catalogue et Index des Sites Médicaux Francophones entry (French)
 André Delmas, "Le Musée Orfila et le Musée Rouvière", in André Pecker, La Médecine à Paris du XIIIè au XXè siècle, Paris, Editions Hervas, Fondation SINGER-POLIGNAC, 1984, pp 289–294.
 Charles Nicolas Houel, Catalogue du musée Orfila, Paris, Paul Dupont-Masson, 1881. 524 pages.
 P. Vallery-Radot, "Le musée Orfila", Histoire de la Médecine, Numéro spécial, 1958, pp 69–78.

Buildings and structures in the 6th arrondissement of Paris
Medical museums in France
1794 establishments in France
Defunct museums in Paris
Museums disestablished in 2005